"Other Side of the World" is a song by Scottish singer-songwriter KT Tunstall, included as the opening track on her debut album, Eye to the Telescope (2004). The song is about the problems of long-distance relationships and how they seldom work out. It is based on a true story of two friends Tunstall had who were a couple but one lived in Scotland and the other in the United States.

"Other Side of the World" was released 9 May 2005 as the second single from that album and became her first top-twenty hit on the UK Singles Chart, peaking at number thirteen. In mid-September 2006, it was released in the United States and Canada as the third and final single from the album. It is reportedly one of Tunstall's favourite songs.

As an April Fool's Day joke, Tunstall's manager told her that another artist was about to release a song almost identical to "Other Side of the World", so they would have to shelve Tunstall's release. As she was proud of her song and fell for the prank, Tunstall joked that she would have to do something major to get him back next year.

Critical reception
"Other Side of the World" received positive reviews from music critics. Billboard.com praised the song's "handsome, relaxed acoustic performance" and "imminently singable chorus".

Track listings

UK CD single 
 "Other Side of the World" (single version)
 "Boo Hoo"

UK limited-edition 7-inch single 
A. "Other Side of the World" (single version) – 3:32
B. "Morning Stars" – 2:46

UK DVD single 
 "Other Side of the World" (video)
 "Black Horse and the Cherry Tree" (video)
 "Throw Me a Rope" (audio)

UK and US digital download
 "Other Side of the World" (radio version)

European CD single 
 "Other Side of the World" (single version)
 "Throw Me a Rope"
 "Boo Hoo"
 "Morning Stars"

Credits and personnel
Credits are lifted from the Eye to the Telescope album booklet.

Studios
 Strings recorded at Little Big Sound (Nashville, Tennessee)
 Mixed at Metrophonic (London, England)
 Mastered at 360 Mastering (London, England)

Personnel

 KT Tunstall – writing, vocals, guitar, Wurlitzer
 Martin Terefe – writing, keyboards, production
 Arnulf Lindner – bass
 Luke Bullen – drums
 Andreas Olsson – drum programming
 Steve Osborne – Shelltone, production
 The Love Sponge Strings – strings
 David Davidson – first violin, string arrangement
 David Angell – second violin
 Kristin Wilkinson – viola
 John Catchings – cello
 Andy Green – additional production
 Baeho "Bobby" Shin – string recording
 Ren Swan – mixing
 Bruno Ellingham – engineering
 Graham Deas – engineering assistance
 Dick Beetham – mastering

Charts

Weekly charts

Year-end charts

Release history

References

2004 songs
2005 singles
2006 singles
KT Tunstall songs
Relentless Records singles
Songs written by KT Tunstall
Songs written by Martin Terefe
Virgin Records singles